Takis Dimopoulos (Greek:Τάκης Δημόπουλος, Pyrgos, Greece, 1898 – Athens, Greece 1981) was a Greek essayist, novelist and philologist.

Life
His studies at the University of Athens included classic literature, philosophy and pedagogy (School of Philosophy), while he studied French and German literature. He worked as a teacher at secondary education in high schools of Crete, Ileia and Athens. He was a member of the Association of Greek Writers and had collaborations with the magazines Anglo-Greek Review, Nea Estia, Nea Skepsi and Parnassos and also with newspapers like Avgi Pyrgou, Kathimerini, Neologos, Patris etc. 

He wrote on essays, prose and poetry. He dealt with issues of aesthetics and philosophy in literature (especially the poetry of Angelos Sikelianos of which he was the main and most important connoisseur.

Relationship with Sikelianos

Dimopoulos was a personal friend of Sikelianos, apart from a keen scholar of his work, fact that gave a very personal/loving tone in his reviews and an 'insider' look at specific and difficult –always poetic- cases based in -very, possibly- private information. His relationship with the work of Sikelianos had been a constant attempt (and care) of analysis, interpretation and explanation of the principles governing the work, the causes (also the "organic": the unbreakable unity of the human spirit and body of Sikelianos resulting in his idiosyncratic trends and moods) that created the specific aesthetic and worldviews of the poet, that created the forms and genres with which Sikelianos expressed himself (both in lyric, if such a discrimination is permitted, and also in dramatic poetry, the literary penetration and critic of Dimopoulos is crucial and valuable).

In Dimopoulos, Sikelianos found a staunch supporter of the Delphic Idea but also a rare tracker of the ideas and necessary predispositions to capture a vision of this magnitude. Dimopoulos wrote and spoke about the thought of Sikelianos (and hence) about the Delphic Idea: but not as an ambassador, but as a scholar who understood Sikelianos and therefore understood how the concept of Delphi as a forum for an international meeting centre of the most important scholars meant. These scholars would only have on their mind the "Love towards the fellow Human". In his studies, Dimopoulos, demonstrates the link and the integration of the Delphic Idea to the main poetic body of Sikelianos` work, as something natural, a concept that encompasses many seemingly contradictory entities and concepts in a unified and multifaceted outlook.

The ancient-mythic, the Dionysian-Bacchic, the Orphic-secret, the physiological-regenerative, Christian, erotic and maternal, national and competitive, the universal, peaceful-conciliatory element were the poetic themes of Sikelianos that were made objects of research and interpretative effort by Takis Dimopoulos, in the form of finding and indicating the fundamental 'axes' of Sikelianos' poetry.

Indicative list of works
The Dithyramb of the Rose (1934) (critic review of the Sikelianos tragedy)
Sikelianos. The dialectic of a lyrical life (1971) (study)
Sikelianos, the Orphic (1981) (study)
Reflections (1985) (unpublished lectures, calendar pages and literary excerpts)
Angelos Sikelianos. The poet and connoisseur (1988) (two-volume edition of the total Sikelianos work by Takis Dimopoulos)

References

Greek writers
1898 births
1981 deaths